The 2001 New England 300 was the 19th stock car race of the 2001 NASCAR Winston Cup Series and the ninth iteration of the event. The race was held on Sunday, July 22, 2001, in Loudon, New Hampshire, at New Hampshire International Speedway, a  permanent, oval-shaped, low-banked racetrack. The race took the scheduled 300 laps to complete. On the final restart with five to go, Dale Jarrett, driving for Robert Yates Racing, would perform a bump-and-run on teammate Ricky Rudd to pull away and win his 29th career NASCAR Winston Cup Series win and his fourth and final win of the season. Rudd was credited with a third-place finish. To fill out the podium, Jeff Gordon, driving for Hendrick Motorsports, would finish second.

Background 

New Hampshire International Speedway is a 1.058-mile (1.703 km) oval speedway located in Loudon, New Hampshire which has hosted NASCAR racing annually since the early 1990s, as well as an IndyCar weekend and the oldest motorcycle race in North America, the Loudon Classic. Nicknamed "The Magic Mile", the speedway is often converted into a 1.6-mile (2.6 km) road course, which includes much of the oval. The track was originally the site of Bryar Motorsports Park before being purchased and redeveloped by Bob Bahre. The track is currently one of eight major NASCAR tracks owned and operated by Speedway Motorsports.

Entry list 

 (R) denotes rookie driver.

Practice

First practice 
The first practice session was held on Friday, July 20, at 10:55 AM EST. The session would last for two hours.

Second practice 
The second practice session was held on Saturday, July 21, at 9:45 AM EST. The session would last for 45 minutes.

Third and final practice 
The final practice session, sometimes referred to as Happy Hour, was held on Saturday, July 21, at 11:00 AM EST. The session would last for 45 minutes.

Qualifying 
Qualifying was held on Friday, July 20, at 2:15 PM EST. Each driver would have two laps to set a fastest time; the fastest of the two would count as their official qualifying lap. Positions 1-36 would be decided on time, while positions 37-43 would be based on provisionals. Six spots are awarded by the use of provisionals based on owner's points. The seventh is awarded to a past champion who has not otherwise qualified for the race. If no past champ needs the provisional, the next team in the owner points will be awarded a provisional.

Mike Bliss was the only driver to fail to qualify.

Full qualifying results

Race results

References 

2001 NASCAR Winston Cup Series
NASCAR races at New Hampshire Motor Speedway
July 2001 sports events in the United States
2001 in sports in New Hampshire